Freddie Jenkins (October 10, 1906 – 1978) was an American jazz trumpeter.

Life and works
He was born in New York City, United States. Jenkins played in the Jenkins Orphanage Band when young, and attended Wilberforce University. Following this he played with Edgar Hayes and Horace Henderson (1924–1928), before taking a position in Duke Ellington's Orchestra in 1928. As a member, he soloed in the 1930 film, Check and Double Check, during a performance of the song "Old Man Blues". He remained with the Ellington Orchestra until 1935, when lung problems forced him to quit.

He recovered and formed his own group in 1935, recording one session as a leader; sidemen included Ward Pinkett, Albert Nicholas and Bernard Addison. After this he played with Luis Russell in 1936. In 1937–38 he played with Ellington again, and for a short time thereafter played with Hayes Alvis. After 1938, his lung ailment returned and he retired from performance. In later years he worked in songwriting, disc jockeying, and in music press, and became a deputy sheriff in Fort Worth. Stanley Dance, writing about a concert played by Ellington and Sarah Vaughan, said

References
Footnotes

General references
Scott Yanow, [ Freddie Jenkins] at AllMusic

1906 births
1978 deaths
American jazz trumpeters
American male trumpeters
Duke Ellington Orchestra members
20th-century American musicians
American male jazz musicians
20th-century American male musicians